John Roulstone Hall (1826 – 1911) was an American architect in Boston.

Work
Eustis Street Fire House at 20 Eustis Street in Roxbury's Dudley Square
Fort Washington (Massachusetts) site additions (1857), 95 Waverly Street Cambridge, Massachusetts 
Hollis Street Theatre (1885) and 17 years later its remodeling and redecoration
Massachusetts State House dome and cupola restoration
48 Commonwealth Avenue in the Back Bay
56 Linwood St, Roxbury (1859)

References

External links

1826 births
1911 deaths
Architects from Boston